Shannon Turner  (born March 6, 1992) is a Canadian ice hockey player. She serves as captain of the Connecticut Whale of the Premier Hockey Federation (PHF).

Playing career

NCAA
At the NCAA level, Turner accumulated 25 points with the Colgate Raiders women's ice hockey program from 2010 to 2012, and 53 points with the Boston University Terriers women's ice hockey program over the course of two seasons, 2012–13 and 2014–15 (she missed the 2013-14 season due to injury). During her time with the Boston University Terriers, the program would win four consecutive Hockey East championships (2012–15). In the aftermath of the 2015 Hockey East tournament, Turner joined Kayla Tutino and captain Marie-Philip Poulin on the All-Tournament Team.

Premier Hockey Federation
On December 31, 2015, Turner was one of three Connecticut Whale players (including Kate Buesser and Kaleigh Fratkin that were loaned to the Boston Pride. The three donned the Pride jerseys for one day and participated in the 2015 Women's Winter Classic, the first outdoor professional women’s hockey game. She was named to the 2019 and 2020 NWHL All-Star Games.

She was named team captain for the Whale ahead of the 2019-20 season. She announced in June 2020 that the 2020-21 NWHL season would probably be her last in professional hockey. However, she pushed back her planned retirement and re-signed with the Whale in October of 2021.

In October of 2022, the Whale announced that Turner had signed an additional one-season contract and would captain the team for the 2022–23 PHF season.

Personal life 
Outside of hockey, Turner teaches English at Greenwich Country Day School. She has a Master's degree in British literature.

Career Statistics

Awards and honours
Colgate Raiders Rookie of the Year (2010–11)
PHF Foundation Award (2021–22)

References

External links
 
 
 Shannon Doyle at Boston University Terriers
 

1992 births
Living people
Canadian schoolteachers
Boston University Terriers women's ice hockey players
Canadian women's ice hockey forwards
Colgate Raiders women's ice hockey players
Connecticut Whale (PHF) players
Ice hockey people from Ontario
Premier Hockey Federation players
Sportspeople from Markham, Ontario